Hubert Nyanhongo is the Zimbabwe Deputy Minister of Energy and Power Development. He is the Member of House of Assembly for Harare South (ZANU-PF).

References

Year of birth missing (living people)
Living people
Members of the National Assembly of Zimbabwe
People from Harare
ZANU–PF politicians